Chollerford Bridge is a stone bridge that replaced an earlier medieval bridge crossing the River North Tyne at Chollerford, Northumberland, England. It is a Grade II listed building.

It was built in 1785 by Robert Mylne after the previous bridge had been swept away in the great floods of 1771.

References

Bridges in Northumberland
Crossings of the River Tyne
Grade II listed bridges
Grade II listed buildings in Northumberland
Wall, Northumberland